Alan McInnes (29 May 1907 – 16 September 1991) was an Australian cricketer. He played one first-class cricket match for Victoria in 1931.

See also
 List of Victoria first-class cricketers

References

External links
 

1907 births
1991 deaths
Australian cricketers
Victoria cricketers
Cricketers from Melbourne